Diplomatic relations between the Russian Federation and Trinidad and Tobago were established on June 6, 1974. Russia is represented in Trinidad and Tobago through a non-resident embassy in Georgetown, Guyana.

Soviet-era relations 
Premier of the Soviet Union Nikita Khrushchev sent a telegram to Eric Williams, the incoming Prime Minister of Trinidad and Tobago, on 30 August 1962 recognising the independence of Trinidad and Tobago from the United Kingdom. In the same telegram, which was sent only hours before the formal independence from the United Kingdom, the Soviet Premier also expressed his willingness to establish diplomatic relations with the new Caribbean nation.

Diplomatic relations between the Soviet Union and Trinidad and Tobago were established on 6 June 1974 in New York City, when the Permanent Representative of the Soviet Union to the United Nations Yakov Malik and his Trinidadian counterpart signed the necessary treaty. Vladimir Kazimirov was appointed as the first Soviet Ambassador to Trinidad and Tobago, in concurrence with his posting as Ambassador to Venezuela, on 19 April 1975. Kazimirov presented his Letters of Credence to Governor-General of Trinidad and Tobago Ellis Clarke on 13 June 1975.

In 1975, Eric Williams travelled to the Soviet Union as part of a thawing of relations between his country and Soviet-aligned states.

Russia and Trinidad 
In August 1992, Trinidad and Tobago recognized Russia as the successor state to the Soviet Union. In 2004, Sergey Lavrov and Knowlson Gift signed a protocol on political consultations between the two ministries. In April 2005, the Chamber of Commerce and Industry of the Russian Federation and the Chamber of Industry and Commerce of the Republic of Trinidad and Tobago signed a cooperation agreement. In 2004, the Russian Cossack folk dance had nine concerts in Port of Spain, San Fernando, Couva, and Tobago. 

In December 2010, Suruj Rambachan, the Trinidad and Tobago Foreign Minister announced that the country had one month previous lifted visa requirements for holders of Russian passports. Rambachan stated that the move, under which holders of those passports would be able to visit Trinidad and Tobago for 90 days visa-free for either business or pleasure, was done to make it easier for those nationals to do business in the country, and to also increase tourism, in which he noted that Russian tourism to Tobago has been increasing.

See also 
 Foreign relations of Russia
 Foreign relations of Trinidad and Tobago

References

External links 
 Documents on the Russia – Trinidad and Tobago relationship from the Russian Ministry of Foreign Affairs 
 Embassy of the Russian Federation in Georgetown about relations with Trinidad and Tobago
 BP offers Gazprom Trinidad LNG for global venture Reuters, 23 August 2007

Trinidad and Tobago
Bilateral relations of Trinidad and Tobago